St James' Church, Birmingham may refer to:

 St James' Church, Edgbaston
 St James' Church, Handsworth
 St James' Church, Mere Green